The Monmouth Museum, alternatively known as The Nelson Museum and Local History Centre, is a museum in Monmouth, Monmouthshire, south east Wales. It features a collection of artifacts associated with Admiral Horatio Nelson. The museum is located in the old Market Hall in the town centre in Monmouth, a short distance from the River Monnow, Monmouth Castle, and Agincourt Square.

History
The Nelson collection was a bequest to the town of Monmouth upon the 1923 death of Lady Georgiana Llangattock, wife of local landowner and town benefactor, John Rolls, 1st Baron Llangattock, and mother of Charles Rolls, who had amassed a collection of Admiral Horatio Nelson memorabilia during the late nineteenth and early twentieth centuries. In the late nineteenth century, Lady Llangattock donated a gymnasium in Glendower Street to the town of Monmouth. After her death, the gymnasium reopened as the Nelson Museum in 1924. The museum moved to new quarters in 1969; the building which initially housed it is known as the Nelson Rooms. The collection includes Nelson's naval officers fighting sword (and those of the surrendered French and Spanish naval commanders at Trafalgar); letters from Nelson both to his wife and to Lady Hamilton; and various items commemorating Nelson's victories, his Royal Navy career and his visit with the Hamiltons to Monmouth town, The Kymin, and South Wales. Also on display are commemorative silverware, prints, paintings, glassware, pottery and models of the Battle of Trafalgar. Among the items from Nelson's visit is the table used when he dined at the Kymin Round House.

The collection also comprises some Nelson fakes, including a glass eye purported to be his, even though he had lost his sight, not the eyeball itself; it is a surgeon's teaching model. The museum also holds items relating to Monmouth town's history and archaeology, and an archive relating to Charles Rolls and his family. One notable example of this is the only known example of an original Monmouth Cap, dating from the 16th century.

The museum opened in 1924 in the gymnasium in Glendower Street which the Llangattock family donated to mark the coming of age of John Maclean Rolls in 1891, now the Nelson Rooms. It moved to its current location in 1969 after the Market Hall had been completely refurbished and redesigned. The entire central part of the Market Hall building had been destroyed by a fire in 1963.

In June 2021, while the museum was closed during the COVID-19 pandemic, the Monmouthshire County Council Cabinet announced that the museum would not reopen in its Market Hall location and would be relocated.

Museum Collection

References

External links 

 
Gathering the Jewels artifact list

Military and war museums in Wales
Museums in Monmouthshire
Biographical museums in Wales
Local museums in Wales
Horatio Nelson
Buildings and structures in Monmouth, Wales
Articles containing video clips
Grade II listed buildings in Monmouthshire